Musquash may refer to:

Animals
 Muskrat

Places
 Musquash Parish, New Brunswick, Canada
 Musquash, New Brunswick, an unincorporated community therein
 Musquash River (Ontario), a river in Ontario, Canada
 Musquash River (New Brunswick), a river in New Brunswick, Canada
 Musquash Island (Minnesota/Wisconsin border), a small island in Pool 8 of the Mississippi River